Żabice may refer to the following places in Poland:
Żabice, Gmina Chocianów in Lower Silesian Voivodeship (south-west Poland)
Żabice, Gmina Grębocice in Lower Silesian Voivodeship (south-west Poland)
Żabice, Lubusz Voivodeship (west Poland)
Zabiče in Slovenia